Bishop of Seoul may refer to:

The bishop of the Anglican Diocese of Seoul
The Roman Catholic Archbishop of Seoul, the Metropolitan Archbishop of the Roman Catholic Archdiocese of Seoul